The Overbrook School for the Blind in Philadelphia, Pennsylvania was established in 1832. Its present site, in the city's Overbrook neighborhood, was acquired in 1890. Along with the Pennsylvania School for the Deaf, the Western Pennsylvania School for Blind Children and the Western Pennsylvania School for the Deaf, it is one of four state-approved charter schools for blind and deaf children in Pennsylvania.

The school produced the first embossed book in America (the Gospel of Mark) and the first magazine for the blind.

History

The school was established in March 1832, as The Pennsylvania Institution for the Instruction of the Blind, by Julius Reinhold Friedlander (1803–1839), a German who had recently come to Philadelphia.

On 27 October 1836, a new building was dedicated on the northwest corner of Schuylkill Third (now Twentieth) and Sassafras (now Race) Streets on what is today the site of the Franklin Institute in the Logan Square neighborhood of Philadelphia.

Friedlander died on 17 March 1837, after years of poor health. At the time of his death, he was not quite 36 years old.

In the 1890s a larger building was needed.  The new building was designed by Cope and Stewardson and was built in the Overbrook section of Philadelphia.  A swimming pool was built in 1906.  In 1946 the school changed its name to the Overbrook School for the Blind. In 1960 the school had a fire.

During the early 1900s, the school offered athletic programs for its students. In June 1907, Overbrook's track and field team members defeated their rivals from the Baltimore School for the Blind in the annual intercollegiate competition held between the schools. 

That same month, Professor Olin H. Burrit became the new superintendent of the school. He had previously been employed as the superintendent of the New York State School for the Blind.

In December 1907, the school's forty-member choir performed at the dedication of Philadelphia's Grace Baptist Temple.

Anne V. Ward (1877–1971) was both an alumna and a faculty member of Overbrook.

Elisabeth Freund (1898–1982) developed a Touch and Learn Center for the school that was a model for other blind centers internationally.

References

External links

Schools in Philadelphia
1832 establishments in Pennsylvania
Schools for the blind in the United States
Educational institutions established in 1832
Private schools in Pennsylvania
Overbrook, Philadelphia